Maybe Trapped Mostly Troubled is the debut studio album by American musician Tessa Violet. It was released on March 18, 2014 by Maker Music on CD-R and digitally. The album has since been removed from all streaming platforms.

Background 
Maybe Trapped Mostly Troubled was released in March 2014. It was her debut album. Seth Earnest, who has worked with Tessa Violet since 2013, produced the album.

Track listing

Reception 
Appraising her YouTube work, We The Unicornss Liam Dryden noted "[a]fter the release of album Maybe Trapped Mostly Troubled, Tessa has been quietly working on her next project." Later, reviewing her single "Dream" in 2016, Dryden said "she's been extremely hard at work on the follow-up to "Maybe Trapped, Mostly Troubled"; and it's all been completely worth it." Reviewing Bad Ideas in 2019, Scot Scoops Zachary Khouri remarked "I’ll be searching for “Maybe Trapped Mostly Troubled,” wherever I can find it." Billboards Hannah Malach described Maybe Trapped Mostly Troubled as "energetic."

References

2014 debut albums
Tessa Violet albums